Cwm Dewi is a Site of Special Scientific Interest (or SSSI) in Pembrokeshire, South Wales. It has been designated as a Site of Special Scientific Interest since January 2010 in an attempt to protect its important geological elements.

Type
This site is designated due to its geological qualities: a spectacular landform created during the Ice Age.

Cwm Dewi SSSI is one of the most important sites in Britain where Quaternary landforms and deposits can be studied. The valley which separates Dinas Island from the adjacent plateau was formed by the meltwater produced when an ice sheet which covered north Pembrokeshire thawed.

See also
List of Sites of Special Scientific Interest in Pembrokeshire

References

External links
Natural Resources Wales website

Sites of Special Scientific Interest in Pembrokeshire
Valleys of Pembrokeshire